Riding the Wave may refer to:
Riding the Wave (album), 2004 album by The Blanks
"Riding the Wave (song)", a 2018 single by Sheppard

See also
Riding the Wave: The Whale Rider Story, documentary film by Jonathan Brough about the feature film Whale Rider
"Riding the Waves (For Virginia Woolf)", a song by Steve Harley on the 1978 album Hobo with a Grin